Hakea dohertyi, commonly known as the Kowmung hakea, is a shrub endemic to a restricted locale in the Great Dividing Range in central New South Wales in Australia.

Description
The  smaller branches are covered with densely matted, silky hairs at flowering time. The leaves are smooth with three longitudinal veins at an angle to the leaf blade ending in a sharp point. The  solitary inflorescence consists of 4-6 cream-white flowers in a raceme in leaf axils. The woody oval shaped fruit have a short stalk and grow at an angle to the stem.

Taxonomy and naming
Kowmung hakea was first formally described by Laurence Haegi in 1999 and published in
Flora of Australia. Hakea dohertyi is named after ecologist Michael Doherty who discovered the species.

Distribution and habitat
It grows on sandy or rocky soils over shale or quartzite, and is found on ridges in open sclerophyll forest with grey gum (Eucalyptus punctata, silvertop ash (E. sieberi),  Blaxland's stringybark (E. blaxlandii), forest she-oak (Allocasuarina torulosa), and shrubs such as crinkle bush (Lomatia silaifolia), (Stypandra glauca), and narrow-leaved geebung (Persoonia linearis).
Hakea dohertyi is killed by bushfire and regenerates from seed stored in a seed bank in its canopy. Most seed is released from the woody follicles after bushfires, but some follicles open and release seed at other times. As the plant requires five years to mature and set seed, bushfires occurring more frequently than this could wipe out the species entirely.
The species is currently classified as endangered. It is grazed upon and threatened by wild goats. The rising of the water level of Lake Burragorang could also threaten populations.

Conservation status
Hakea dohertyi is classified as "endangered" by the  New South Wales Office of Environment and Heritage.

References

dohertyi
Flora of New South Wales
Proteales of Australia
Plants described in 1999